Jesper Håkansson (born 14 August 1981) is a Danish former professional footballer. He mostly appeared as a midfielder or a forward.

Club career

Håkansson can play as attacking midfield, winger or striker and has extensive experience having played in the Danish, Dutch and Swedish leagues.

In 1997 Håkansson won the Danish Under-17 Player of the Year award. He made his first-team debut in the Danish 1st Division at age 16, making him the second youngest BK Frem player ever after Sophus Nielsen.

After leaving BK Frem in 1999, Håkansson went on trial with Manchester United; however, he chose to join Dutch Eredivisie club Heerenveen, where he believed he would get more game time. He scored a goal on his debut against Dutch giants Ajax. After a short loan spell back in Denmark with Viborg in 2003, he returned to Heerenveen before spending the entire 2004–05 season on loan to RBC Roosendaal. He then joined Djurgården in Sweden, for whom he only made one appearance.

After a year in Sweden, Håkansson returned to the Netherlands to play for ADO Den Haag, but he did not make his debut until 19 January 2007, coming on for the last 10 minutes of a 3–1 loss at home to AZ Alkmaar. Early in the 2007–08 season, he then moved back to Denmark to play with Lyngby BK. He scored three goals for Lyngby, including one in his last game for the club on 24 May 2007 against Copenhagen.

Håkansson signed a two-year contract with the Newcastle United Jets on 30 July 2008 after a week-long trial. He made his debut for the Newcastle Jets on 29 August 2008, in a 5–0 defeat at the hands of Melbourne Victory. His time in Australia was marked by frequent injuries, and he played just 10 times for Newcastle before being released on 30 January 2009, so that he could return to Europe. Six weeks later, he signed with FC Amager but after less than a month they went bankrupt and he joined his former club, Frem, scoring five goals in just seven appearances. After the season, it was announced that Frem would only be allowed to sign amateur contracts and Håkansson had to find a new club for the third time in six months.

In June 2009, he signed for second-tier club AB. Håkansson made 16 appearances for AB, scoring one goal, but when AB missed out on promotion, Håkansson was released. He later signed for FC Roskilde, where he stayed for five years before retiring in 2015.

International career
He has represented Denmark at under-16, under-17, under-19, under-20 and under-21 levels. He is the third youngest player to have represented Denmark at the under-21 level.

In April 2007 he was called up for the Danish national team, but has not yet featured in a competitive game.

Honours

Club
Djurgården
Allsvenskan: 2005
Svenska Cupen: 2005

Individual
 DFA U-17 Player of the Year: 1997

References

External links

 Danish national team profile
 FC Roskilde profile
 Jesper Håkansson Interview with Bold 
 Jesper Håkansson Interview with FTBL
 Djurgårdens IF interview

1981 births
ADO Den Haag players
A-League Men players
Allsvenskan players
Boldklubben Frem players
Danish expatriate men's footballers
Danish men's footballers
Danish Superliga players
Denmark under-21 international footballers
Denmark youth international footballers
Djurgårdens IF Fotboll players
Eredivisie players
Expatriate footballers in the Netherlands
Expatriate footballers in Sweden
Expatriate soccer players in Australia
FC Roskilde players
Living people
Newcastle Jets FC players
People from Albertslund Municipality
SC Heerenveen players
Viborg FF players
Association football forwards
Association football midfielders
Association football wingers
Sportspeople from the Capital Region of Denmark